The Holden FB is an automobile produced by Holden in Australia from 1960 to 1961. Introduced on 14 January 1960, the FB series replaced the Holden FC range.

Model range 
The FB range consisted of four-door sedans in two trim levels, five-door station wagons in two trim levels, a two-door coupe utility and a two-door panel van. The six models were marketed as follows:
 Holden Standard Sedan
 Holden Standard Station Sedan
 Holden Special Sedan
 Holden Special Station Sedan
 Holden Utility
 Holden Panel Van

The Holden Business Sedan, which had been marketed as part of the FC range, was not carried over to the FB series.

Changes 
The FB was promoted as being longer, lower, more spacious and more powerful than the FC model, but in reality it was only slightly so on each count. Overall length was  greater, although the wheelbase remained the same. The engine bore was still , the last model with that specification. Engine capacity remained at  but the compression ratio was raised. However, the resulting extra  of power did not compensate for the greater weight of the FB, so performance was inferior to that of its predecessor. Changes were also made to the brakes, front coil springs, air cleaner and clutch.

Obvious styling differences were the lower bonnet, finned rear mudguards with new taillights (on the sedans and wagons only) and a wrap-around windscreen. Seating was improved, as was the instrument panel.

Notably, the FB was the first Holden model to also be produced in left-hand drive form, those vehicles being destined for export markets.

Engines 
All FB models were powered by a  inline six-cylinder engine, the last to have the  bore size, producing .

Production and replacement 
After a production run of 147,747 vehicles, the FB was replaced by the Holden EK series in May 1961.

References

Further reading 
 Norm Darwin, 100 Years of GM in Australia, 2002, pages 230–231
 Norm Darwin, The history of Holden since 1917, 1983
 The Sixties Holden Archive – Holden FB Retrieved from members.tripod.com on 15 October 2009

Cars of Australia
FB
Cars introduced in 1960
Cars discontinued in 1961